The table below details the Grand Prix results of the other teams for which Cosworth was an engine supplier.

Formula One World Championship results

One-off entries (1963-1966)
(key)

1967
(key)

1968
(key)

1969
(key)

1970
(key)

1971
(key)

1972
(key)

1973
(key)

1974
(key)

1975
(key)

1976
(key)

1977
(key)

1978
(key)

1979
(key)

Notes
 * – Started illegally.
 ‡ – Half points awarded as less than 75% of the race distance was completed.

2000s
(key)

Notes
  – Driver did not finish the Grand Prix, but was classified as he completed over 90% of the race distance.

2010s
(key)

References

Formula One constructor results
Cosworth